A dioxetane or dioxacyclobutane is an organic compound with formula C2O2H4, whose backbone is a four-membered ring of two oxygen atoms and two carbon atoms. There are two isomers:
 1,2-dioxetane where the oxygen atoms are adjacent.
 1,3-dioxetane where the oxygen and carbon atoms alternate.